Schrankia taona is a species of moth of the family Erebidae first described by Tams in 1935. It is found on Samoa in the South Pacific Ocean.

References

Moths described in 1935
Hypenodinae